Cassandra "Cassie" Potter (née Johnson) (born October 30, 1981) is an American curler best known for skipping the United States Women's Curling Team at the 2006 Winter Olympics and the 2005 Women's World Curling Championships. Her sister is fellow curler and long-time teammate Jamie Haskell.

Career

Early career
Potter was born in Bemidji, Minnesota, a curling hotbed. She began playing the game at age 5, and honed the strategic elements of her game by watching Canadian curling competitions on television. After playing as an alternate at the 1998 World Junior Curling Championships for the 5th-place U.S. team skipped (captained) by Hope Schmitt, Cassandra returned to the Junior Championships in 2002, this time as the skip of the team; she and her United States squad went on to capture the gold medal with a win over Matilda Mattsson of Sweden. In 2003, Cassie returned once again to the World Junior Championships, and once again made it to the final. However, this time she lost, with Marliese Miller of Canada winning the gold.

2005–present
In 2005, Johnson competed in the U.S. 2006 Olympic Trials/National Championships, which she won, thus gaining the right to represent the USA at both the 2006 Winter Olympics and the 2005 World Women's Curling Championship. At the 2005 World Championships, she again won a silver medal, this time losing to Anette Norberg's Swedish rink in the final. For her efforts, Cassie was named USA Curling's Female Athlete of the Year in 2005. Cassie made a difficult, pressure-packed shot in the 11th end of the final match of the 2006 Olympic Trials to qualify for the Turin Games.

Johnson's Winter Olympics experience was a difficult one, though, as she and her United States team lost five of their first six matches en route to a mediocre 2–7 record in the round-robin stage of the tournament. Immediately after the 2006 Olympics, a re-arrangement occurred on the team's roster for the 2006 U.S. World Team Trials. Johnson became the team's alternate, while Jessica Schultz skipped the team. At the trials, the team finished in fourth place, losing the 3–4 page game to Margie Smith. The team went back to their Olympic lineup for later events, however.

Upon their semifinal win at the 2012 United States Women's Curling Championship, Potter and her team were qualified to participate at the 2014 United States Olympic Curling Trials.

Personal life
Potter became engaged the week after the 2006 Winter Olympics ended, and was married in 2007. She graduated from Bemidji State University with a degree in graphic design. She enjoys fishing and listening to music when she's not curling, and is a big fan of the Minnesota Twins. When she was 12, Potter was diagnosed with a heart murmur due to a congenital heart defect in her tricuspid valve, but the condition is not severe and does not interfere with her daily life.

Potter's biography page at NBC's Winter Olympics website was among the most-viewed of any U.S. athlete, and she received countless marriage proposals from men all over the world at the U.S. Women's Curling Team's official blog, which crashed early in the Games after receiving 12.9 million hits in one day.

Potter comes from a curling family; she played together with older sister Jamie for many years, her parents Liz and Tim have won the U.S. Mixed Curling Championships four times, and her grandparents and great-grandparents were curlers as well. Her father Tim is also a two-time Men's National Champion and 1993 World bronze medalist.

Teams

Women's

Mixed doubles

Awards
Frances Brodie Award: 2005
USA Curling Female Athlete of the Year: 2005
USA Curling Team of the Year: 2005, 2002
WJCC All-Star Skip: 2002
Winner, Curtis Cup (team sportsmanship award) at U.S. Junior Nationals in 1999 and 2000

References

External links

1981 births
Living people
People from Bemidji, Minnesota
Olympic curlers of the United States
Curlers at the 2006 Winter Olympics
American curling champions
American female curlers
21st-century American women